Costello Athletic Center is a 2,000-seat multi-purpose arena located at 261 Riverside St. Lowell, Massachusetts.  It is home to the University of Massachusetts Lowell River Hawks men's and women's basketball teams.  On either side of the gymnasium there are bleachers over looking the court for spectators to watch. In 2020, the building was renovated by Beacon Architectural Associates. The renovations include a new team room, expansion of the training room, and renovations to the locker room and bathrooms. The total cost was $3,048,000 and construction lasted for 6 months.

See also
 List of NCAA Division I basketball arenas

References

External links
 Costello Athletic Center
Boston Building and Bridge

1964 establishments in Massachusetts
Basketball venues in Massachusetts
College basketball venues in the United States
UMass Lowell River Hawks men's basketball
Sports venues completed in 1967
Sports venues in Lowell, Massachusetts